On a Night Like This may refer to:

Music
On a Night Like This (concert tour), Kylie Minogue

Albums
On a Night Like This, album  by Buckwheat Zydeco 1987
On a Night Like This, album by Simone Egeriis
On a Night Like This, compilation album by The Boomtown Rats 2008

Songs
On a Night Like This (Bob Dylan song), 1973, covered by Los Lobos
"On A Night Like This", song by Dan Seals, from Rebel Heart 1983 
"On A Night Like This", hit single by The Shadows, written John David 1984
"On A Night Like This", song by Eddy Arnold, written Steven Dale Jones & Bud McGuire	1993
"On A Night Like This", song by La Bouche, from Moment of Love 1997 
"On A Night Like This", song by Lari White, from Stepping Stone 1998 
On a Night Like This (Kylie Minogue song), written Torch, Stack, Taylor and Rawling 2000
On a Night Like This (Trick Pony song), written Doug Kahan and Karen Staley, 2001
"On A Night Like This", song by The Strawbs, from Déjà Fou 2004
"On A Night Like This", song by Sanne Salomonsen,  Peer Astrom / Troy Verges, from The Show 2005, and The Hits 2006
"On A Night Like This", song by Gerry Rafferty